Todd Lamb (born October 19, 1971) is an American politician who served as the 16th lieutenant governor of Oklahoma from 2011 to 2019.
A Republican, he was a member of the Oklahoma Senate from 2004 to 2011. For the 52nd Oklahoma Legislature, Lamb's fellow Republican state senators elected him as their Majority Floor Leader. As Majority Leader, Lamb was the second highest ranking state senator, behind then-Senate President pro tempore Glenn Coffee.

On July 1, 2009, Lamb filed to run for Lieutenant Governor of Oklahoma in the 2010 elections to succeed outgoing lieutenant governor Jari Askins, who stepped down to run for Governor of Oklahoma. Lamb ran for governor in the 2018 Oklahoma gubernatorial election, placing in third in the primary to former Oklahoma City mayor Mick Cornett and Tulsa businessman Kevin Stitt, who became the eventual GOP nominee and governor-elect.

On June 2, 2019, Lamb announced that he would become a panelist of Flash Point, a locally-produced Sunday morning political talk show on NBC affiliate KFOR-TV in Oklahoma City, effective at the start of the program's June 16 broadcast. He took over the conservative panelist seat being vacated by former Oklahoma City mayor Kirk Humphreys.

Early life and education
Lamb is the son of Norman Lamb, a former Oklahoma state senator and the former Oklahoma Secretary of Veterans Affairs under Governor Brad Henry. Lamb was raised in Enid, Oklahoma, and graduated from Enid High School. Lamb attended Louisiana Tech University, where he was member of the Louisiana Tech Bulldogs football team. After two years at La. Tech, he transferred to Oklahoma State University where he received his bachelor's degree. Todd also received his Juris Doctor from Oklahoma City University School of Law in 2005.

Career 
In 1993, he joined Frank Keating's campaign for Governor of Oklahoma, and was subsequently appointed to the Governor's staff following the November 1994 election. He resigned from the Governor's staff in order to become a special agent with the United States Secret Service in 1998, where he conducted numerous criminal investigations relating to counterfeiting, bank fraud, identity theft, and threats against the president of the United States. During the 2000 presidential election campaign, he served as a site supervisor for George W. Bush's campaign. In 2001, he was appointed to the national Joint Terrorism Task Force, and following the September 11 attacks, was assigned to assist in the investigation of the attacks.

Oklahoma Senate
Lamb was a member of the Oklahoma Senate from 2004 to 2011, representing the 47th Senate District (which includes part of Oklahoma City as well as Edmond). He faced no opposition in the 2008 election.

In August 2009,he introduced a bill requiring doctors to perform ultrasounds and offer women information about the tests before performing abortions. The bill was struck down. As majority floor leader, Lamb was ex officio member of all committees.

Lieutenant Governor

On July 1, 2009, Lamb filed to run for the office of Lieutenant Governor of Oklahoma in the 2010 elections. Senator Lamb made his announcement in late August 2009. As part of the announcement, Senator Lamb held events in Oklahoma City, Tulsa, Enid, and Lawton.

Lamb faced four Republican primary election opponents in John A. Wright (R-Broken Arrow), a member of the Oklahoma State House, Bill Crozier (a former Republican candidate for Superintendent of Public Instruction), Bernie Adler (an Oklahoma City real estate investor), and Paul Nosak (a tree removal service owner from Oklahoma City), and won the primary election with over 66% of the votes cast, thus avoiding a runoff.

In the general election, Lamb faced Democrat Kenneth Corn and independent candidate Richard Prawdzienski and won with over 64% of the votes cast.

During his tenure, Lamb served in the cabinet of Mary Fallin as Small Business Advocate. He resigned from that position on February 16, 2017, due to his opposition to proposed tax increases.

2018 gubernatorial campaign

Lamb ran in the Republican primary for Governor of Oklahoma in the 2018 election.

He lost the primary election on June 26 to Mick Cornett, former mayor of Oklahoma City, and businessman Kevin Stitt. Stitt won the runoff and later defeated former attorney general Drew Edmondson in the November general election.

Election results

November 4, 2008, Election results for Oklahoma

State Senator for District 47

November 4, 2014, Election results for Lieutenant Governor of Oklahoma

References

External links
  Office of the Lieutenant Governor Website
 Todd Lamb for Lt. Governor
 Oklahoma State Election Board, 2004
 

|-

|-

|-

1971 births
21st-century American politicians
Candidates in the 2018 United States elections
Enid High School alumni
Lieutenant Governors of Oklahoma
Living people
Louisiana Tech Bulldogs football players
Oklahoma City University School of Law alumni
Oklahoma lawyers
Republican Party Oklahoma state senators
Oklahoma State University alumni
Politicians from Enid, Oklahoma
United States Secret Service agents